"Invincible" is a song by English singer Lemar from his same-titled fifth studio album (2012). It was released as the album's lead single in the United Kingdom as a digital download on 12 August 2012. The song peaked at number 158 on the UK Singles Chart.

Background
Talking about the song Lemar said in an interview with Digital Spy: "Sticking together is what makes you invincible. When times are hard, it's important to stick together and know what your values are." The track was recorded in sessions that took place in London and Los Angeles.

Music video
A music video to accompany the release of "Invincible" was first released onto YouTube on 20 July 2012 at a total length of three minutes and twenty-three seconds. The video tells the story of the star's childhood love and the pair's developing relationship up until the present day.

Track listing

Notes
 denotes additional producer
 denotes remix producer

Charts

Release history

References

2012 singles
Lemar songs
2012 songs
Songs written by Lemar